Wollishofen is a neighbourhood in Zürich's 2nd district. It was formerly a municipality of its own, having been incorporated into Zürich in 1893. The neighbourhood has a population of 15,592 distributed on an area of 5.75 km2.

Geography 

Located between the Sihl river and Lake Zurich, it forms the southern boundary of the city on the left bank of the lake. The lake occupies 28.5% (1.64 km2) of the total area of the district. To the south, Wollishofen borders the municipalities of Adliswil and Kilchberg.

Werkbundsiedlung Neubühl

A New Objectivity estate constructed 1930-1932.  Architects: Max Haefeli, Alfred Roth, Emil Roth, Carl Hubacher, Rudolf Steiger, Werner Max Moser and Paul Artaria

Transport
Wollishofen is located on the A3 motorway, and on tram route 7 of the Verkehrsbetriebe Zürich. Zürich Wollishofen railway station is a stop on line S8 and S24 of the Zürich S-Bahn or Bus-Line 72.

The Zürichsee-Schifffahrtsgesellschaft (ZSG) and its ship yard are located in Wollishofen.

Culture 
Zürcher Theater Spektakel, an international theater festival ranking among the most important European festivals for contemporary performing arts, is held annually in August on the Landiwiese lakeshore and on the Saffa-Insel. The cultural centre Rote Fabrik is also located in Wollishofen, as well as Lydia Escher's former home, the Villa Belvoir.

Education

International schools:
 SIS Swiss International School

Sport
The neighbourhood's football club is FC Wollishofen. Their stadium, located on Zürichstrasse, is called Sonnau. As of 2020–21, the team plays in the 2. Liga Region Zürich, the sixth tier of football in Switzerland.

Notable people 
 Walter Andreas Müller (born 1945), actor and comedian, born and raised in Zürich

References

Gallery

External links 

 Website of the "Quartierverein" Wollishofen 

District 2 of Zürich
Former municipalities of the canton of Zürich